is a passenger railway station located in the city of Kishiwada, Osaka Prefecture, Japan, operated by the private railway operator Nankai Electric Railway. It has the station number "NK23".

Lines

Layout
The station consists of two opposed side platforms.The platforms are independent of one another, and passengers wishing to change platforms must exit and re-enter the station.

Platforms

Adjacent stations

History
Izumi-Ōmiya Station opened on 10 April 1937.

Passenger statistics
In fiscal 2019, the station was used by an average of 4852 passengers daily.

Surrounding area
 Hyozu Jinja (Izumi-Ōmiya)

See also
 List of railway stations in Japan

References

External links
  

Railway stations in Japan opened in 1937
Railway stations in Osaka Prefecture
Kishiwada, Osaka